A Steinitz Variation is any of several chess openings introduced and practiced, or adopted and advocated by Wilhelm Steinitz, the first officially recognized World Chess Champion.

Openings
 Steinitz Variation in the Caro-Kann Defence: 1.e4 c6 2.d4 d5 3.Nc3 dxe4 4.Nxe4 Nd7
 Steinitz Variation in the Evans Gambit: 1.e4 e5 2.Nf3 Nc6 3.Bc4 Bc5 4.b4 Bxb4 5.c3 Bc5 6.d4 exd4 7.0-0 d6 8.cxd4 Bb6 9.Nc3 Na5 10.Bg5 f6 11.Be3
 Steinitz Variation in the Evans Gambit: 1.e4 e5 2.Nf3 Nc6 3.Bc4 Bc5 4.b4 Bxb4 5.c3 Ba5 6.0-0 Qf6 
 Steinitz Variation in the French Defence: 1.e4 e6 2.d4 d5 3.Nc3 Nf6 4.Bg5 Be7 5.e5 Nfd7 6.Bxe7 Qxe7 7.f4
 Steinitz Variation in the French Defence: 1.e4 e6 2.d4 d5 3.Nc3 Nf6 4.e5
 Steinitz Variation in the French Defence: 1.e4 e6 2.d4 d5 3.e5 c5 4.dxc5
 Steinitz Attack in the French Defence: 1.e4 e6 2.e5
 Steinitz Defence to the Giuoco Piano: 1.e4 e5 2.Nf3 Nc6 3.Bc4 Bc5 4.0-0 Nf6 5.d3 d6 6.Bg5 h6 7.Bh4 g5
 Steinitz Variation in the Giuoco Piano: 1.e4 e5 2.Nf3 Nc6 3.Bc4 Bc5 4.c3 Nf6 5.d4 exd4 6.cxd4 Bb4+ 7.Nc3 Nxe4 8.0-0 Bxc3 9.bxc3 d5 10.Ba3
 Steinitz Variation in the King's Gambit: 1.e4 e5 2.f4 exf4 3.Bc4 Ne7 
 Steinitz Attack in the Petrov's Defence: 1.e4 e5 2.Nf3 Nf6 3.d4
 Steinitz Variation in the Petrov's Defence: 1.e4 e5 2.Nf3 Nf6 3.d4 exd4 4.e5 Ne4 5.Qe2
 Steinitz Variation in the Philidor Defence: 1.e4 e5 2.Nf3 d6 3.Bc4 Be7 4.c3
 Steinitz Variation in the Ponziani Opening: 1.e4 e5 2.Nf3 Nc6 3.c3 d5 4.Qa4 f6
 Steinitz Variation in the Queen's Gambit Accepted: 1.d4 d5 2.c4 dxc4 3.Nf3 Nf6 4.e3 e6 5.Bxc4 c5 6.0-0 cxd4 
 Steinitz Countergambit in the Queen's Pawn Game: 1.d4 d5 2.Bf4 c5  
 Steinitz Defence to the Ruy Lopez: 1.e4 e5 2.Nf3 Nc6 3.Bb5 d6
 Steinitz Defence Deferred to the Ruy Lopez: 1.e4 e5 2.Nf3 Nc6 3.Bb5 a6 4.Ba4 d6
 Steinitz Defence Doubly Deferred to the Ruy Lopez: 1.e4 e5 2.Nf3 Nc6 3.Bb5 a6 4.Ba4 Nf6 5.0-0 d6
 Steinitz Variation in the Scotch Game: 1.e4 e5 2.Nf3 Nc6 3.d4 exd4 4.Nxd4 Qh4 5.Nc3
 Steinitz Variation in the Sicilian Defence: 1.e4 c5 2.g3
 Steinitz Variation in the Three Knights Opening: 1.e4 e5 2.Nf3 Nc6 3.Nc3 g6
 Steinitz Variation in the Two Knights Defense: 1.e4 e5 2.Nf3 Nc6 3.Bc4 Nf6 4.Ng5 d5 5.exd5 Na5 6.Bb5+ c6 7.dxc6 bxc6 8.Be2 h6 9.Nh3
 Steinitz Variation in the Vienna Game: 1.e4 e5 2.Nc3 Nf6 3.f4 d5 4.d3
 Steinitz Gambit in the Vienna Game: 1.e4 e5 2.Nc3 Nc6 3.f4 exf4 4.d4

Illustrations

Notes

References

Chess openings